Kumbara are a community of people residing in Tamil Nadu, Karnataka, Andhra Pradesh, and other areas.

See also
Kulala

Social groups of Karnataka
Hindu communities